Eucalyptus perriniana, commonly known as spinning gum, is a tree or mallee which is native to New South Wales, the Australian Capital Territory, Victoria and Tasmania. Spinning gum is a sub-alpine species and grows in areas which are normally snow covered for several months in winter. However domestic cultivars can grow in almost any temperate climate.

Description
The juvenile leaves are arranged in opposite pairs, more or less round and lack a peduncle.

Taxonomy and naming
Eucalyptus perriniana was first formally described in 1894 by Leonard Rodway from an unpublished description by Ferdinand von Mueller. Rodway's description was published in Papers and Proceedings of the Royal Society of Tasmania. Rodway did not give a reason for the specific epithet (perriniana) but George Samuel Perrin was Conservator of Forests in Tasmania in 1886 and 1887 before being appointed Conservator of Forest in Victoria in 1888.

Distribution and habitat
Spinning gum grows in woodland on high, cold plains in New South Wales, the Australian Capital Territory, Victoria and Tasmania.

Conservation
This eucalypt is listed as "rare" under the Tasmanian Government Threatened Species Protection Act 1995. Only about one thousand individual plants are known from that state.

Uses 
Catechin-7-O-glucoside and catechin-5-O-glucoside can be produced by biotransformation of (+)-catechin by cultured cells of E. perriniana.

See also 
 List of Eucalyptus species

Gallery

References

External links 
 

Myrtales of Australia
perriniana
Flora of New South Wales
Flora of Tasmania
Flora of Victoria (Australia)
Mallees (habit)
Plants described in 1894
Taxa named by Ferdinand von Mueller